List of cannabis regulatory agencies may refer to one of the following:

List of Canadian cannabis regulatory agencies
List of United States cannabis regulatory agencies